Listen to the Ahmad Jamal Quintet is an album by American jazz pianist Ahmad Jamal featuring performances recorded  in 1960 and released on the Argo label.

Critical reception
Allmusic awarded the album 4½ stars.

Track listing
 "Ahmad's Waltz" (Ahmad Jamal) – 4:44  
 "Valentina" (Christine Reynolds) – 2:19
 "Yesterdays" (Otto Harbach, Jerome Kern) – 2:57 
 "Tempo for Two" (Joe Kennedy) – 3:26
 "Hallelujah" (Vincent Youmans, Leo Robin) – 2:06   
 "It's a Wonderful World" (Harold Adamson, Jan Savitt, Johnny Watson) – 2:50 
 "Baía" (Ary Barroso) – 4:04 
 "You Came a Long Way from St. Louis" (John Benson Brooks, Bob Russell) – 3:53
 "Lover Man" (Jimmy Davis, Ram Ramirez, James Sherman) – 4:04  
 "Who Cares?" (George Gershwin, Ira Gershwin) – 3:05

Personnel
Ahmad Jamal – piano
Joe Kennedy – violin
Ray Crawford – guitar
Israel Crosby – bass
Vernel Fournier – drums

References 

Argo Records albums
Ahmad Jamal albums
1961 albums